The Permian is a geological period.

Permian or Permians may also refer to:

 Permian Basin (Europe), a sedimentary basin in Europe
 Permian Basin (North America), a sedimentary basin in North America
 Permian High School, a school in Odessa, Texas
 Permians, a Uralic peoples

See also
 Perm (disambiguation)
 Permic languages
 Permsky (disambiguation)